The Hobart Cup is a Tasmanian Racing Club Group 3 Thoroughbred horse race held as an open handicap race over a distance of 2400 metres at Elwick Racecourse in Glenorchy, Tasmania, Australia.  The Cup is usually held on the first or second Monday in February. Total prizemoney is A$250,000.

History
The 1972 winner of this race, Piping Lane, went on to win the Melbourne Cup later in the year. 
The Assyrian is the only other horse to win both the Melbourne Cup and Hobart cup in 1882/83. 
In the past the race has been held on the Australia Day holiday. 
It is part of the Tasmanian Summer Racing Carnival, and is also one of Tasmania's main annual social events.

Distance
 1875–1877 – 2 miles (~3200 metres)
 1878–1885 - 1 miles (~2600 metres)
 1886–1972 - 1 miles (~2400 metres)
 1973–1989 – 2380 metres
 1990–2004 – 2400 metres
 2005 – 2100 metres
 2006–2012 – 2200 metres
 2013 onwards - 2400 metres

Grade
 1875–1979 - Principal race
 1980–2003 -  Group 3 
 2004–2006 -  Group 2 
 2007 onwards - Group 3

Winners

 2022 - Ho Ho Khan
 2021 - Double You Tee
2020 - Toorak Affair
2019 - Eastender
2018 - Pretty Punk
2017 - Count Da Vinci
2016 - Up Cups
2015 - Geegees Blackflash
 2014 - Epingle
 2013 - Hurdy Gurdy Man
 2012 - Geegees Blackflash
 2011 - Bid Spotter
 2010 - Growl
 2009 - Gotta Keep Cool
 2008 - Offenbach
 2007 - Blutigeroo
 2006 - True Courser
 2005 - Our Dashing Dane
 2004 - Zacielo
 2003 - Jeune's Mark
 2002 - St. Andrews
 2001 - Brorama Star
 2000 - Lord Baracus
 1999 - Future Shock
 1998 - L'Espion
 1997 - Palos Verdes
 1996 - Jam City
 1995 - Courtly Way
 1994 - Southern States
 1993 - Frontier Boy
 1992 - Russian Rogue
 1991 - Have A Heart
 1990 - Firetap
 1989 - Nakagima
 1988 - Brisque
 1987 - Cylai
 1986 - Dark Intruder
 1985 - Macbyrne
 1984 - Viscount Geoffrey
 1983 - Palomine
 1982 - Powerful Prince
 1981 - Andrias
 1980 - Strident King
 1979 - Kubla Khan
 1978 - Clean Heels
 1977 - Brallos
 1976 - Brallos
 1975 - Lord Pascoe
 1974 - Knee High
 1973 - Sir Trutone
 1972 - Piping Lane
 1971 - Trial And Error
 1970 - Dark Purple
 1969 - Delarus
 1968 - Bounteous
 1967 - Haughty Boy  
 1966 - Sailing Prince
 1965 - Macdalla
 1964 - Macdalla
 1963 - Volterra
 1962 - Great Singer
 1961 - Welton
 1960 - Orden
 1959 - King's Thane
 1958 - Legismars
 1957 - Buzzie
 1956 - Seriki
 1955 - Seriki
 1954 - Sea Wolf
 1953 - Sir Legis
 1952 - Royal Release
 1951 - Tarcombe
 1950 - English
 1949 - The Artist
 1948 - Evade
 1947 - Wingfire
 1946 - Paramente
 1945 - Gaelane
 1944 - Thurso Bay
 1943 - Lord Saltash
 1942 - Maco Roni
 1941 - Mercator
 1940 - El Nene
 1939 - Maco Roni
 1938 - Stylish Lady
 1937 - Royalty
 1936 - Coolart
 1935 - Sunbronze
 1934 - Song Of Solomon
 1933 - Air Favourite
 1932 - Billy Barton
 1931 - Royal Simon
 1930 - Tarapunga
 1929 - Prince Viol
 1928 - Roonsleigh
 1927 - Roonsleigh
 1926 - Royal Simon
 1925 - Pukka
 1924 - Llanthony
 1923 - Binbi
 1922 - Ouverte
 1921 - Talisman
 1920 - †Nadir Shah / Trusty Blade 
 1919 - Prince Moeraki
 1918 - Ladino
 1917 - Sea Pink
 1916 - Polska
 1915 - Defence
 1914 - Delphic
 1913 - Belove
 1912 - Flavel
 1911 - Bolan
 1910 - Eighteen Carat
 1909 - Jack Smith
 1908 - Admirer
 1907 - Viola
 1906 - Postulate
 1905 - Newmarket
 1904 - Proceeder
 1903 - Chesterfield
 1902 - Progredior
 1901 - Timbrel
 1900 - Eiridsdale
 1899 - Flintlock
 1898 - Rosella
 1897 - Benedict
 1896 - Lena
 1895 - Music
 1894 - Amadeus
 1893 - Pauline
 1892 - Hopetoun
 1891 - Lapstone
 1890 - Macquarie
 1889 - Chaldean
 1888 - Ballarat
 1887 - Maori Chief
 1886 - Duration
 1885 - Ringwood
 1884 - King Of The Vale
 1883 - The Assyrian
 1882 - The Marchioness
 1881 - Monarque
 1880 - Avernus
 1879 - Lord Harry
 1878 - Swiveller
 1877 - Spark
 1876 - Strop
 1875 - Ella

† Dead heat

See also
 List of Australian Group races
 Group races

References

External links
Hobart Cup
First three placegetters Hobart Cup (History from racerate.com)

Horse races in Australia
Sport in Hobart
Recurring sporting events established in 1875